Bare Hill Correctional Facility is a medium security state prison in Franklin County, New York, United States.  The prison in the Town of Malone.

Bare Hill C.F. is located by Franklin Correctional Facility, a medium security prison and Upstate Correctional Facility, a maximum security prison. 

The prison opened in 1988, and as of 2010 had a working capacity of 1722.  

Among the programs offered to the inmates is participation in social programs to aid residents of the region.  Almost every prisoner has a work assignment, either within or outside the prison.

Notable inmates
 Richard Delage - serving a life term for shooting and killing a schoolteacher in Mount Kisco in 1960. At the time of the crime, he was only 15 years old.

References

External links  
  Development of the Bare Hills Correctional Facility

Buildings and structures in Franklin County, New York
Prisons in New York (state)
1988 establishments in New York (state)